Sharfuddin Ahmed Jhantu (1952 – 25 February 2018) was a Bangladesh Awami League    politician and a former Jatiya Sangsad member who represented Rangpur-1 constituency. He also served as the first mayor of the Rangpur City Corporation during 2012–2017.

Career
Jhantu was elected to parliament from Rangpur-1 as a Jatiya Party candidate in 1996. He served as the Chairman of Rangpur Sadar Upazila and Rangpur Municipality. He was elected the first Mayor of Rangpur City in 2012. He again contested the 2017 mayoral election as an Awami League candidate but lost to the Jatiya Party candidate Mostafizur Rahman Mostafa.

Death
Jhantu died on 25 Feb 2018 in Labaid Hospital, Dhaka, Bangladesh.

References

1950s births
2018 deaths
People from Rangpur District
Jatiya Party politicians
7th Jatiya Sangsad members
Year of birth missing
Place of birth missing
Mayors of Rangpur